The women's 100 metres hurdles event at the 2017 Summer Universiade was held on 26 and 27 August at the Taipei Municipal Stadium in Taipei, Taiwan.

Medalists

Results

Heats
Qualification: First 4 in each heat (Q) and next 4 fastest (q) qualified for the semifinals.

Wind:Heat 1: -1.8 m/s, Heat 2: -0.9 m/s, Heat 3: +0.8 m/s, Heat 4: +1.3 m/s, Heat 5: +0.6 m/s

Semifinals
Qualification: First 2 in each heat (Q) and the next 2 fastest (q) qualified for the final.

Wind:Heat 1: -2.5 m/s, Heat 2: -1.8 m/s, Heat 3: -3.0 m/s

Final

Wind: -1.3 m/s

References

Athletics at the 2017 Summer Universiade
2017